Basketball at the 2013 Canada Summer Games was held at the Palais de Sports, and Bishop's University John H. Price Sport Centre  in Sherbrooke, Quebec.

The events will be held during the first week between August 4 and 17, 2013.

Medal table
The following is the medal table for basketball at the 2013 Canada Summer Games.

Medalists

Men's

Group A

Group B

Group C

Playoffs

Women's

Group A

Group B

Group C

Playoffs

References

Summer Games
2013 Canada Summer Games
Canada Games 2013